Dvoriki is a rural locality (a village) in Penkinskoye Rural Settlement, Kameshkovsky District, Vladimir Oblast, Russia. The population was 35 as of 2010.

Geography 
Dvoriki is located 24 km southwest of Kameshkovo (the district's administrative centre) by road. Pozharnitsy is the nearest rural locality.

References 

Rural localities in Kameshkovsky District